Dinara is a regional market in Rohtas district, Bihar, India, near the National Highway 30. The birthplace of the famous poet Dariya Saheb is just 5 km from Dinara.

Geography 
The whole Dinara block is located on the Sasaram Plain. The block covers an area of 28,732.00 hectares, with the lands belonging to the village of Dinara itself covering 588 hectares. The block has 2 hectares of forest.

Land use 
Of the block's 28,732.00 hectares, 91.33% is classified as cultivable land. Of this, 99.45% is irrigated, which is the highest proportion among blocks in Rohtas district. Of the 588 hectares in Dinara village, 508 are under cultivation, all of which are irrigated.

Demographics 
As of 2011, the population of Dinara was 11,733, in 1,883 households, while the overall block population was 225,468, in 33,227 households.

Dinara is an entirely rural sub-district, with no major urban centres. The sex ratio of Dinara sub-district in 2011 was 926, which was above the Rohtas district average of 918. The sex ratio was higher among the 0-6 age group, where it was 940, again above the Rohtas district average of 931. Members of scheduled castes made up 18.87% of the block population, and members of scheduled tribes made up 0.38%. The literacy rate of the block was 71.43%, below the overall Rohtas district rate of 73.37%. Literacy was higher in men than in women, with 81.52% of men but only 60.49% of women able to read and write. The corresponding 21.03% gender literacy gap was slightly higher than the Rohtas average of 19.91%.

Employment 
A majority of Dinara block's workforce was employed in agriculture in 2011, with 31.60% being cultivators who owned or leased their own land and another 47.51% being agricultural laborers who worked someone else's land for wages. A further 3.22% were household industry workers, and the remaining 16.20% were other workers.

Amenities 
The village of Dinara does not have tap water, with drinking water instead provided by hand pump. 9 villages have tap water. No villages have public toilets. 119 of the block's 181 inhabited villages, Dinara among them, have electrical power, or 65.75%, the lowest proportion in Rohtas. 44 villages have telephone service.

Transport 
There is bus service but no railway station in Dinara. Dinara has permanent pucca roads, which are connected to both national and state highways. On the block level, there are 20 villages with pucca roads, or 11.05%, the lowest proportion in Rohtas. 44 villages have transport communications, defined as bus, rail, or navigable waterways; 16 of these have bus service, and no villages have rail access.

Villages 
There are 229 villages in Dinara block, including the village of Dinara itself. Of these, 181 are inhabited and 48 are uninhabited.

References

Villages in Rohtas district